Leechburg is a borough in southern Armstrong County in the U.S. state of Pennsylvania,  northeast of Pittsburgh. A population of 2,149 residents live within the borough limits as of the 2020 census, according to US Census Bureau.  Leechburg was founded by David Leech, for whom it was named, and was incorporated as a borough in 1850.
Located along the Kiskiminetas River, Leechburg was a major port of the Pennsylvania Canal. Early in the 20th century, it was the site of extensive steel sheet works, foundries, cement plants, and productive coal mines. Leechburg was the first place where natural gas was used for industrial purposes.

Local government
Leechburg is governed by a Mayor and Council. Current officials and when their terms expire are:

Mayor: Tony Roppolo (D) 2023

Council:

Tom Foster (D), President 2023

Chuck Pascal (D), Vice President 2025

Lorrie Bazella (R) 2025

John Mrvan (R) 2025

Doreen Smeal (D) 2023

Alan Tarr (D) 2025

D.J. Zelczak (R) 2023

Federal and state representatives
Leechburg is in Pennsylvania's 15th Congressional District, represented in Congress by Rep. Glenn Thompson (R).

At the state level, Leechburg is in the 41st Senatorial District, represented by State Senator Joe Pittman (R), and in the 60th Legislative District, represented by Rep. Abby Major (R).

Geography
Leechburg is located at  (40.629304, -79.603727).

The town is bordered by the Kiskiminetas River to the south, on the border of Westmoreland County, and Gilpin Township to the north.

Demographics

As of the census of 2000, there were 2,386 people, 1,109 households, and 645 families residing in the borough. The population density was 5,320.9 people per square mile (2,047.2/km²). There were 1,193 housing units at an average density of 2,660.5 per square mile (1,023.6/km²). The racial makeup of the borough was 97.53% White, 1.26% African American, 0.04% Native American, 0.17% Asian, 0.04% from other races, and 0.96% from two or more races. Hispanic or Latino of any race were 0.67% of the population.

There were 1,109 households, out of which 23.4% had children under the age of 18 living with them, 43.2% were married couples living together, 10.7% had a female householder with no husband present, and 41.8% were non-families. 39.1% of all households were made up of individuals, and 23.1% had someone living alone who was 65 years of age or older. The average household size was 2.14 and the average family size was 2.85.

The borough median age of 43 years was significantly more than the county median age of 40 years. The distribution by age group was 21.1% under the age of 18, 6.4% from 18 to 24, 26.2% from 25 to 44, 22.5% from 45 to 64, and 23.7% who were 65 years of age or older. The median age was 43 years. For every 100 females, there were 83.7 males. For every 100 females age 18 and over, there were 78.5 males.

According to the US Census Bureau, in 2012 the median household income in the borough was $35,682 and the median family income was $45,563.  17.8% of the population, 14.4% of families, 29.3% of children, and 8.8% of those 65 or older had income below the poverty level.

History

Leechburg was founded in 1850 by David Leech. Prior to 1850, the settlement was known as White Plains. David Leech purchased the land from a local Native American known as White Maddock.

Notable people

John Phillips, U.S. Ambassador to Italy
Mickey Morandini, Olympic athlete and All-Star MLB second baseman
Alex Kroll, professional football player and CEO of Young & Rubicam
Joseph Grant Beale, Member of Congress and industrialist
Larry J. Kulick, current Bishop of the Diocese of Greensburg

Education
The children of Leechburg are educated by the Leechburg Area School District.  The school district consists of Leechburg, Gilpin Township and West Leechburg Borough.

Cemeteries
Leechburg Cemetery

References

External links

Leechburg Area Museum and Historical Society

Populated places established in 1832
Pittsburgh metropolitan area
Boroughs in Armstrong County, Pennsylvania
1850 establishments in Pennsylvania